is a yonkoma manga series by Katsuhiko Hotta which was published by Takeshobo in Manga Life from 1988 through 1998. An anime series was adapted from the manga in 1990 by Sunrise, which aired on TV Asahi. The title Obatarian (or Obattalion) is a Japanese buzzword from the late 1980s, created as a pun portmanteau of the Japanese word おば (oba, meaning  "middle-aged woman") and the Japanese title (Battalion/バタリアン) of the 1985 zombie comedy movie The Return of the Living Dead.

The series won the 1989 Bungeishunjū Manga Award.

References

External links
 Hotta Katsuhiko at the Ultimate Manga Guide
 
 

1988 manga
1990 anime films
Anime television films
Comedy anime and manga
Sunrise (company)
Takeshobo manga
Yonkoma
Seinen manga